"Precious" is a song by English electronic band Depeche Mode from their studio album, Playing the Angel (2005). It was released on 3 October 2005 by Mute, Sire, and Reprise Records as the album's lead single. The song reached  4 on the UK Singles Chart, No. 71 on the US Billboard Hot 100, and No. 23 on the US Modern Rock Tracks chart. It also topped the charts in Denmark, Italy, Spain, and Sweden, and it peaked within the top 10 in Austria, Wallonia, Canada, Finland, Germany, and Norway.

Background and lyrics
Depeche Mode main songwriter Martin Gore wrote the song while he was going through a divorce. The track is a message to Gore's children, who were aware of the divorce, and Gore felt guilty that they had to witness the process. Recognising their "fragile" state, Gore expresses his sympathy for them but also mentions that "things get broken" and tells them to keep faith in their parents.

Chart performance
Released in the United Kingdom on 3 October 2005, "Precious" debuted at No. 4 on the UK Singles Chart, which would become its peak, and spent a total of six weeks in the top 100. In Ireland, on 6 October, the song first appeared at its peak of No. 12 on the Irish Singles Chart. It was a chart-topper across mainland Europe, debuting at the top position in Italy and Spain and rising to No. 1 in Denmark, Hungary, and Sweden. On the Eurochart Hot 100, "Precious" reached No. 4, peaking within the top 10 in Austria, Finland, Germany, Greece, Norway, and the Wallonia region of Belgium. In the Czech Republic, France, the Netherlands, Switzerland, and the Flanders region of Belgium, it entered the top 40.

In the United States, where "Precious" was serviced to radio on 26 September 2005, the song debuted at No. 99 on the Billboard Hot 100 and rose its highest position, No. 71, the following issue, 7 November 2005. It spent only one more week on the Hot 100, at No. 80, before leaving the listing. The single found better success on the Billboard dance charts, topping both the Hot Dance Club Play and Hot Dance Singles Sales rankings on 29 October 2005. It additionally found peaks of No. 6 on the Adult Alternative Songs chart, No. 23 on the Modern Rock Tracks chart, and No. 32 on the Adult Top 40. On the Canadian Singles Chart, the record reached No. 2 and remained on the listing for 12 weeks.

Music video
The music video for "Precious" features the band performing on an empty, computer-generated cruise ship, before walking out into an alien-looking (also CG) forest. The video was directed by Uwe Flade, who directed the "Enjoy the Silence 04" video, and was leaked online before the song's release.

B-sides
"Free" is the B-side to "Precious". It's a techno beat with an old school feel. It was unavailable in the US, aside from importing, but is now available on iTunes. It also appears as a bonus track on the Japanese version of Playing the Angel. There is no remix of the song, aside from an early version that was heard at the Touring the Angel press conference, as shown on the Playing the Angel Electronic Press Kit, however, the full/stand-alone version is not available for download or purchase at this time.

Track listings

UK and European CD single
 "Precious" (album version) – 4:10
 "Precious" (Sasha's Spooky mix single edit) – 5:45

European limited 7-inch picture disc
A. "Precious" (album version)
B. "Precious" (Michael Mayer Ambient mix)

European 12-inch single
A. "Precious" (Sasha's Spooky mix full length) – 10:32
AA. "Precious" (Sasha's Gargantuan vocal mix full length) – 9:40

European enhanced CD single
 "Precious" (album version)
 "Free"
 "Precious" (video)

European maxi-CD single
 "Precious (Sasha's Garganfuan vocal mix edit) – 7:11
 "Precious (Misc. Full vocal mix) – 5:44
 "Free – 5:12

US and Canadian maxi-CD single
 "Precious (Sasha's Spooky mix) – 7:33
 "Precious (Sasha's Gargantuan vocal mix) – 7:10
 "Precious (Michael Mayer Balearic mix) – 7:18
 "Precious (Misc. Full vocal mix) – 5:41
 "Precious (Misc. Crunch mix) – 6:51
 "Precious (Motor mix) – 6:37

US digital download (radio version)
 "Precious" (US radio version) – 4:07
 "Free" – 5:10

DVD single
 "Precious" (video)
 "Precious" (Motor remix)
 "Precious" (Michael Mayer Ambient mix)

Personnel
Personnel are lifted from the UK CD single liner notes.
 Martin L. Gore – writing
 Ben Hillier – production, mixing, engineering
 Steve Fitzmaurice – mixing
 Dave McCracken – programming
 Richard Morris – programming, engineering
 Anton Corbijn – art direction, photography, cover design
 Jonathan Kessler – management
 JD Fanger – Depeche Mode office

Charts

Weekly charts

Year-end charts

Certifications and sales

Release history

See also
 List of number-one hits of 2005 (Denmark)
 List of number-one hits of 2005 (Italy)
 List of number-one singles of 2005 (Spain)
 List of number-one singles of 2005 (Sweden)
 List of Billboard Hot Dance Club Play number ones of 2005

References

External links
 Single information from the official Depeche Mode web site
 Allmusic review

2005 singles
2005 songs
Depeche Mode songs
Mute Records singles
Number-one singles in Denmark
Number-one singles in Hungary
Number-one singles in Italy
Number-one singles in Spain
Number-one singles in Sweden
Reprise Records singles
Sire Records singles
Song recordings produced by Ben Hillier
Songs written by Martin Gore